This is a list of properties and districts in Paulding County, Georgia that are listed on the National Register of Historic Places (NRHP).

Current listings

|}

References

Paulding
Buildings and structures in Paulding County, Georgia